The Herman M. and Hanna Hediger House is located in Neillsville, Wisconsin.

History
The Swiss immigrant Hedigers designed this house in the style of a Swiss chalet and brought a cabinet-maker and a mason from Switzerland to help build it. Herman had immigrated around 1921 and worked as a cheesemaker at Christie and Neillsville.

The house was added to both the State and the National Register of Historic Places in 2013.

References

Houses on the National Register of Historic Places in Wisconsin
National Register of Historic Places in Clark County, Wisconsin
Houses in Clark County, Wisconsin
Houses completed in 1949